Robert Buell Rowe (born May 23, 1945 in Flint, Michigan) is a former American football defensive lineman in the National Football League.

College career
Rowe played college ball at Western Michigan University and lettered three seasons (1964-1966) playing defensive tackle for the Broncos. He collected 211 tackles and was selected as the Mid-American Conference Lineman of the Year in his junior and senior seasons at Western Michigan. In 1966, Rowe was named second-team All-America by the Associated Press and played in the East-West Shrine Bowl and College All-Star Game.

Pro career
Rowe was a 2nd round selection (43rd overall pick) in the 1967 NFL Draft by the St. Louis Cardinals. He played 9 seasons (1967–1975) in the NFL, all for the Cardinals, and his 54.5 sacks rank fifth in franchise history. He also intercepted two passes in 1969, returning one for a touchdown against the Minnesota Vikings.

One of Rowe's career highlights was blocking three Jim O'Brien field goals in the Cardinals' 10-3 win over the Baltimore Colts in the 1972 NFL season opener. Rowe led the league in blocked kicks that season and finished his career with 9.5 blocks. In 2019, Rowe was ranked as the 26th greatest kick blocker in NFL history.

After football
Rowe still lives in the St. Louis area and was inducted into the St. Louis Sports Hall of Fame in 2019.

References

External links
NFL.com player page

1945 births
Living people
American football defensive ends
American football defensive tackles
Eastern Conference Pro Bowl players
Players of American football from Flint, Michigan
St. Louis Cardinals (football) players
Western Michigan Broncos football players